Since the founding of the Church of Scientology in 1954 by L. Ron Hubbard, the relationship between Scientology and psychiatry has been dominated by strong opposition by the organization against the medical specialty of psychiatry, and of psychology, with themes relating to this opposition occurring repeatedly throughout Scientology literature and doctrine. According to the Church of Scientology, psychiatry has a long history of improper and abusive care. The group's views have been disputed, criticized and condemned by experts in the medical and scientific community and been a source of public controversy.

L. Ron Hubbard had a complex and changing relationship with psychiatry;  He recalled positive experiences with psychiatrists in his youth and requested psychiatric treatment in adulthood.  By 1948, Hubbard claimed to volunteer in a psychiatric clinic and two years later published "Dianetics: The Modern Science of Mental Health".   In 1951, however, Hubbard's wife Sara Northrup Hollister reportedly consulted psychiatrists who recommended Hubbard be institutionalized; thereafter, Hubbard was increasingly hostile towards psychiatry.

In 1995, Scientologist Lisa McPherson died at "Flag Land Base" after leaving a hospital where she refused psychiatric treatment.

In 2003, a man with untreated schizophrenia murdered his mother after his paranoid delusions caused him to become convinced the Scientology-approved vitamins she was giving him in lieu of effective medication were poisonous.

In 2005, celebrity Scientologist Tom Cruise achieved notoriety for his public opposition to psychiatry.

L. Ron Hubbard and psychiatry
 
L. Ron Hubbard was an American author of science fiction and fantasy stories.  Hubbard reported many encounters with psychiatrists, from the age of 12 onward.

During World War II, Hubbard was hospitalized; in 1947, Hubbard requested psychiatric treatment and the following year moved with his wife to Savannah, Georgia, where he was reportedly associated with a psychiatric clinic.

In 1950, Hubbard published Dianetics: The Modern Science of Mental Health.

In 1951, it was publicly reported that Hubbard's wife Sara had been advised by a psychiatrist that Hubbard should be institutionalized for treatment of paranoid schizophrenia. They divorced, and the following year, Hubbard founded Scientology, an anti-psychiatry religious movement.

Overview
Hubbard's views on psychiatry evolved over time.

Hubbard spoke positively of his childhood and teen encounters with psychiatrists in the 1920s and 30s. At the age of 12, Hubbard was accompanied by Navy psychiatrist Joseph Thompson on an ocean trip from Seattle to Washington, D.C. Hubbard likewise wrote positively of teenage/young-adult encounters with D.C.-based psychiatrist William Alanson White. Some of Hubbard's later works included acknowledgements to both Thompson and White, and Hubbard would later claim to have received clinical training from Thompson and White.

In contrast, Hubbard spoke more critically of his later encounters with psychiatrists and psychiatric institutions—Hubbard had written positively of psychiatric hospital superintendent William Alanson White, but White's successor (Winfred Overholser) was singled out for criticism. Hubbard likewise spoke critically of his encounters with a Washington, D.C. institution for the treatment of schizophrenia called "Walnut Lodge" (presumably Chestnut Lodge).

During the Second World War, Hubbard was hospitalized at Oak Knoll Military Hospital. In 1947, Hubbard wrote a letter to the VA requesting psychiatric treatment. The following year, Hubbard and his wife Sara moved to Savannah, Georgia, where Hubbard would later recall having been associated with a charity mental health clinic.

According to Hubbard, he worked as a volunteer helping to treat charity patients during his time in Savannah. While in Savannah, Hubbard began working on a "book of psychology" about "the cause and cure of nervous tension"; the next year, he published Dianetics: The Modern Science of Mental Health.

In 1951, Hubbard's wife Sara reportedly consulted a psychiatrist who recommended Hubbard be institutionalized. Hubbard initially responded by kidnapping Sara. Thereafter, he took their daughter and fled to Havana. After Sara went public with her story, Hubbard returned her daughter. In his final known encounter with a psychiatrist, Hubbard consulted a practitioner in order to rebut public claims of his own mental illness.

Thereafter, Hubbard was increasingly hostile towards psychiatry. In the 50s, Hubbard sought to identify "Subversive" psychiatrists or other "Potential Subversives". By the early 70s, Hubbard wrote of having redefined the word "psychiatrist" to mean "an antisocial enemy of the people".

Hubbard's early encounters with psychiatry

Hubbard claimed to have personal encounters with several named psychiatrists beginning in his childhood. Some, like Thompson and White, would later be remembered favorably—Hubbard explicitly cited both as sources for his work. Others, such as Overholser and Center, were the subject of scorn.

Joseph Cheesman Thompson
In 1923, Navy medical doctor and psychoanalyst Joseph "Snake" Thompson accompanied Hubbard on a voyage. Hubbard recalled "I traveled with Commander Thompson from Seattle, Washington through the Panama Canal to Washington, D.C. when I was about twelve and knew him during all that time that I was in Washington and later." Hubbard recalled that "[Thompson's] friends called him 'Snake' and his enemies called him 'Crazy'. He had lots of both." In another recording of Hubbard sharing anecdotes from his life, he considered Thompson to be a "very great man" who sparked Hubbard's interest in "the human mind". Hubbard said that Thompson told him, "If it's not true for you, it's not true."

In 1952, Hubbard recalled that "I was just a kid and Commander Thompson didn't have any boy of his own, and he and I just got along fine." Hubbard continued "Why he [Thompson] took it into his head to start beating Freud into my head, I don't know. But he did."

In 1953, Hubbard argued "It's very odd to realize, as I did one day, that in subsequent years I have approximated to a very remarkable degree the career of Commander Thompson - to show you what an impressed - impressionable boy can have handed to him suddenly."

In 1954, Hubbard described an encounter with psychiatrists in which playing sports was seen as a positive indicator:  
"I knew people, and the people who were trained by these people. And, if there was anything they were in awe of, it was somebody who engaged in sports. So this fellow was phenomenal to them. They knew this was very good somehow or another, but they couldn’t quite put their finger on it.    And to this day it is enough to tell a psychiatrist that, and prove to him, that you are very energetic and engaged in sports, to have him dismiss you immediately as being completely sane. Only that’s just, bing. He just says, "Well, I…" He just goes into apathy right at that point. That’s the truth.  
"The…  it was an interesting thing, for instance, to William Allen White. And Commander Thompson. Both of them, where I was concerned, that I wasn’t very interested in sitting around figuring about this stuff and didn’t seem to be terribly interested in the insane."

Hubbard described later encounters with Thompson: "In 1930 I knew a fellow by the name of Commander Thompson. I had known him before, actually".

In 1958, Hubbard told an audience:  "I have made people feel better by using straight Freudian analysis the way I got it from Commander Thompson who imported it to the US Navy, not via Catherine [sic] Horney".

Thompson died in 1943, seven years before the publication of Dianetics.  Thompson was included in the Acknowledgements section of 1951's Science of Survival, as was William A. White.

William Alanson White

William Alanson White was an American neurologist and psychiatrist who served as superintendent of St. Elizabeths Hospital.   A letter from the Hubbard Association of Scientologists International to the FBI, dated June 12, 1954, claims that Hubbard was trained by both Joseph Thompson and William Alanson White. Hubbard recalled "Dr. William Alanson White, a very fine man. He was head of the big St. Elizabeth’s, the big mental institution there in Washington, D.C., and he had been a friend of mine for quite a while. I had met him through other friends of Dr. Thompson's".  In a lecture, Hubbard described consulting White about a theoretical calculation of human memory capacity, apparently during Hubbard's university days. Hubbard recalled that "he [White] used to see me every once in a while".

In a 1951 lecture, Hubbard described St. Elizabeth's as "where they sent the naval officers after they had received their fifth contradiction from the Navy Department".

For two years in the 1920s, White had opened the doors of St. Elizabeths to Alfred Korzybski, enabling Korzybski to directly study mental illness, research that contributed heavily to Korzybski's 1933 Science and Sanity: An Introduction to Non-Aristotelian Systems and General Semantics.  Hubbard cited the relationship between Korzybski and White in his lectures.

White died in 1937, thirteen years before the publication of Dianetics.  White was included in the Acknowledgements section of 1951's Science of Survival, as was Joseph Thompson.

"Walnut Lodge"

For much of the 1920s and 30s, L. Ron Hubbard lived in Washington D.C.  In 1932, Hubbard listed the US Naval Hospital in Washington as his address; In 1933, Hubbard listed a P.O. box in Beallsville, Maryland.

In a 1952 lecture, Hubbard recalls his interaction with staff and patients at a facility specializing in schizophrenia which he calls "Walnut Lodge" (presumably Chestnut Lodge): 

Hubbard would return to "Walnut Lodge" in future writings. A 1970 bulletin states that "$2,000 a month for board only is the price at Walnut Lodge in Washington DC, an average place." In his work Mission Earth, Hubbard writes "Arginal P. Pauper was today committed to Walnut Lodge Nut House".

Hubbard as patient

During World War Two, Hubbard was hospitalized at California military hospital.  After his release, he wrote to the Veterans Administration to request further treatment;  Thereafter he and his wife moved to Savannah Georgia where he was reportedly associated with a charity mental health clinic.

Oak Knoll Military Hospital
In 1945, Hubbard was a patient at Oak Knoll Military Hospital. Hubbard's estranged son, Ron DeWolf, would later state that Hubbard received psychiatric treatment during his hospitalization. Hubbard would later cite his time with psychiatric patients at Oak Knoll "using a park bench as a consulting room" as a major influence on his development of Dianetics.

Request for psychiatric treatment
After his discharge, Hubbard sought out psychiatric help to treat his "long periods of moroseness and suicidal inclinations" but reported that he could not afford it. A letter dated October 15, 1947, which Hubbard wrote to the Veterans Administration (VA) begins: "This is a request for treatment". The letter continues:

The following year, Hubbard and his wife moved to Savannah, Georgia where he was associated with a charity psychiatric clinic.

Hubbard as wouldbe psychologist

After his arrival in Savannah, Hubbard began to describe himself as mental health practitioner,  ultimately authoring Dianetics.

Savannah, Georgia psychiatric clinic 
Beginning in June 1948,  the nationally-syndicated wire service United Press ran a story on an American Legion-sponsored psychiatric ward in Savannah, Georgia which sought to keep mentally-ill war veterans out of jail.  That summer, Hubbard was arrested by the San Louis Obispo sheriff on a charge of petty theft for passing a fraudulent check.

In late 1948, Hubbard and his second wife Sara moved from California to Savannah, Georgia, where he would later claim to have "worked" as a "volunteer" in the psychiatric clinic, where he claimed he "processed an awful lot of Negroes". Hubbard later wrote of having observed a "Dr. Center" in Savannah: 

In a 1966 interview, Hubbard recalled a man receiving a bill for psychoanalysis:  "These people, you know, in psychoanalysis, they worked on somebody for a year just to find out if they could help him and then they charged him about 9000 quid for having not helped him".

Dianetics
In January 1949, Hubbard wrote that he was working on a "book of psychology" about "the cause and cure of nervous tension", which he was going to call The Dark Sword, Excalibur or Science of the Mind. In April 1949, Hubbard wrote from Savannah to inform the Gerontological Society at Baltimore City Hospital that he was preparing a paper entitled Certain Discoveries and Researches Leading to the Removal of Early Traumatic Experiences Including Attempted Abortion, Birth Shock and Infant Illnesses and Accidents with an Examination of their Effects Physiological and Psychological and their Potential Influence on Longevity on the Adult Individual with an Account of the Techniques Evolved and Employed. The Society apparently declined involvement.

He also wrote to the American Medical Association and the American Psychiatric Association. These letters, and their responses, have not been published, though Hubbard later said that they had been negative. Hubbard later wrote, "In 1948 I wrote a thesis on an elementary technique of application and submitted it to the medical and psychiatric professions for their use or consideration. The data was not utilized."

In December 1949, Hubbard composed a letter to publisher John Campbell in which he provided an article entitled "A Criticism of Dianetics" to be published under the pen name Irving R. Kutzman, M.D. (ostensibly an opponent of Dianetic auditing). In his letter to Campbell, Hubbard described synthesizing the opinions of multiple doctors: 

The following year, Hubbard authored Dianetics: the Modern Science of Mental Health, a handbook for "the psychiatrist, psycho-analyst and intelligent layman".

By September 1950, the American Psychological Association's governing body unanimously adopted a resolution advising its members against using Hubbard's techniques with their patients and leading psychologists spoke out against Dianetics. Thereafter, Hubbard was critical of psychiatry.

Winfred Overholser was superintendent of St. Elizabeths Hospital after 1937. By 1950, he was president of the American Psychiatric Association. In a 1953 lecture, Hubbard claimed: 
In 1972, Hubbard recalled: 

In another lecture, Hubbard claimed he gave a speech in which he hypnotized the staff of St. Elizabeth's.

In late 1950, Hubbard criticized mainstream psychiatry but still wrote positively of Sigmund Freud as a fellow persecuted trailblazer, arguing that "to talk of the faults of Freud, as do those who practice psychoanalysis today, is ungenerous. This great pioneer, against the violent objections of medical doctors and the psychiatrists of his day, ventured to put forth the theory that memory was connected with present time behavior" Hubbard elaborated: "Freud was so thoroughly shunned by neurologists of his day and medicine ever since, that only his great literary skill brought his work as far as it has come."

As late as 1955, Hubbard still identified himself with mental health professions, describing himself as "a writer, a scientist, and a psychologist".

Attempted institutionalization and aftermath

In 1951, Hubbard's wife Sara sought advice from a psychiatrist who recommend Hubbard be institutionalized. Upon learning of the plan,  Hubbard initially kidnapped Sara; After her release, Hubbard fled to Havana with their young daughter. Hubbard then underwent a public divorce in which his wife publicly alleged that Hubbard had been diagnosed with paranoid schizophrenia.  Upon his return to the US, Hubbard consulted with a psychiatrist to rebut public claims of his mental illness.

Sara consults psychiatrist 
In 1951, Hubbard's wife Sara went to a psychiatrist to obtain advice about his increasingly violent and irrational behaviour, and was told that he probably needed to be institutionalized and that she was in serious danger. She gave Hubbard an ultimatum: get treatment or she would leave with the baby. He was furious and threatened to kill their daughter Alexis rather than let Northrup care for her. Sara later recalled: "He didn't want her to be brought up by me because I was in league with the doctors. He thought I had thrown in with the psychiatrists, with the devils."

In a letter to the Attorney General dated May 1951, Hubbard claims that on "Feb. 25  she [Sara] flew to San Francisco and my general managers Jack Maloney in New Jersey received a phone call from her and Miles Hollister and a psychiatrist named Meyer Zelig in San Francisco that I had gone insane and that they needed money to incarcerate me quickly."

Two decades later, in 1972, Hubbard would write to followers:

Hubbard kidnaps wife; daughter
On the night of February 24, 1951, Hubbard allegedly took daughter Alexis while Sara was at a movie theater.  A few hours later, he returned with two of his Dianetics Foundation staff and told Sara, who was now back at her apartment: "We have Alexis and you'll never see her alive unless you come with us." She was bundled into the back of a car and driven to San Bernardino, California, where Hubbard attempted to find a doctor to examine his wife and declare her insane. His search was unsuccessful and he released her at Yuma Airport across the state line in Arizona. He promised that he would tell her where Alexis was if she signed a piece of paper saying that she had gone with him voluntarily. She agreed but Hubbard reneged on the deal and flew to Chicago, where he found a psychologist who wrote a favorable report about his mental condition to refute Northrup's accusations. Rather than telling Northrup where Alexis was, he called her and said that "he had cut [Alexis] into little pieces and dropped the pieces in a river and that he had seen little arms and legs floating down the river and it was my fault, I'd done it because I'd left him."

From March to May 1951, Hubbard fled to Havana with his infant daughter. According to his estranged son Ronald DeWolf, Hubbard was under psychiatric care at this time.

Public allegation of Hubbard having 'paranoid schizophrenia'
After her release, Sara filed for divorce, charging Hubbard with causing her "extreme cruelty, great mental anguish and physical suffering". Her allegations produced more lurid headlines: not only was Hubbard accused of bigamy and kidnapping, but she had been subjected to "systematic torture, including loss of sleep, beatings, and strangulations and scientific experiments". Because of his "crazy misconduct" she was in "hourly fear of both the life of herself and of her infant daughter, who she has not seen for two months".

On April 23, 1951, it was publicly reported that Sara had consulted doctors who "concluded that said Hubbard was hopelessly insane, and crazy, and that there was no hope for said Hubbard, or any reason for her to endure further; that competent medical advisers recommended that said Hubbard be committed to a private sanatorium for psychiatric observation and treatment of a mental ailment known as paranoid schizophrenia." The San Francisco Chronicle coverage used the headline "Ron Hubbard Insane, Says His Wife".

Hubbard's lover, Barbara Klowden, recorded in her journal:
He [Hubbard] talked about what he was going to do to psychiatrists.

How he brought psychotic into present time in psychiatrists office and how that psychiatrist said to him "If you think you've cured this woman you're crazy. If you claim to cure people by doing that, if you're not careful, we'll lock you up." He laughed and laughed.

Then, tearing indignantly at chicken leg, he said "They all came to me and said I was a psychotic. Hah. They called me a paranoid. Can you imagine?"

My blood ran cold as he was saying that and it was all I could do to keep from weeping. Wouldn't it tear your heart out coming from the one you love when you knew all the time was a psychotic and a paranoid?

Psychiatry as evil
In 1955, Hubbard wrote that "nearly all the backlash in society against Dianetics and Scientology has a common source — the psychiatrist-psychologist-psychoanalyst clique". In a letter addressed to the FBI dated July 11, Hubbard reports having been the victim of an "attack made by psychiatrists using evidently Communist connected personnel".

In 1956, Hubbard wrote an article entitled "A Critique of Psychoanalysis" which embodies Hubbard's harder stance. Writes Hubbard: "Now and then it becomes necessary to eradicate from a new subject things which it has inherited from an old. And only because this has become necessary am I persuaded to tread upon the toes of the "grandfather" to Dianetics and Scientology." In the essay, Hubbard admits that from "the earliest beginnings of Dianetics it is possible to trace a considerable psychoanalytic influence." Hubbard makes a distinction between Dianetics and Scientology writing that "Scientology, unlike Dianetics, is not a psychotherapy. It is therefore from the dominance of Scientology rather than from the viewpoint of Dianetics that one can understand the failings of psychoanalysis, its dangers and the reasons why it did not produce what it should have produced."

We discover psychoanalysis to have been superseded by tyrannous sadism, practiced by unprincipled men, themselves evidently in the last stages of dementia. This, then, is the end of the trail for psychoanalysis—a world of failure and brutality. Today men who call themselves analysts are merrily sawing out patients’ brains, shocking them with murderous drugs, striking them with high voltages, burying them underneath mounds of ice, placing them in restraints, “sterilizing” them sexually and generally conducting themselves much as their patients would were they given the chance. It is up to us to realize, then, that psychoanalysis in its pure practice is dead the moment the spirit of humanity in which Freud developed the work is betrayed by the handing over of a patient to the merciless misconduct which passes today for treatment.

In 1957, Hubbard founded the "National Academy of American Psychology" which sought to issue a "loyalty oath" to psychologists and psychiatrists. Those who opposed the oath were to be labelled "Subversive" psychiatrists, while those who merely refused to sign the oath would be labelled "Potentially Subversive".

In 1958, Hubbard wrote that "Destroy is the same as help to a psychiatrist". His 1958 writings cited "Psychiatry: The Greatest Flub of the Russian Civilization" by Tom Esterbrook; Hubbard's son would later reveal that Tom Eastebrook was one of Hubbard's many pen-names.

In 1966 Hubbard declared all-out war on psychiatry, telling Scientologists that "We want at least one bad mark on every psychiatrist in England, a murder, an assault, or a rape or more than one." He committed the Church of Scientology to the goal of eradicating psychiatry in 1969, announcing that "Our war has been forced to become 'To take over absolutely the field of mental healing on this planet in all forms.'"

By 1967, Hubbard claimed that psychiatrists were behind a worldwide conspiracy to attack Scientology and create a "world government" run by psychiatrists on behalf of the USSR:

Our enemies are less than twelve men. They are members of the Bank of England and other higher financial circles. They own and control newspaper chains and they, oddly enough, run all the mental health groups in the world that had sprung up […]. Their apparent programme was to use mental health, which is to say psychiatric electric shock and pre-frontal lobotomy, to remove from their path any political dissenters […]. These fellows have gotten nearly every government in the world to owe them considerable quantities of money through various chicaneries and they control, of course, income tax, government finance —  Wilson, for instance, the current Premier of England, is totally involved with these fellows and talks about nothing else actually.

Referring to psychiatrists as "psychs", Hubbard wrote of psychiatrists as denying human spirituality and peddling fake cures. He taught that psychiatrists were themselves deeply unethical individuals, committing "extortion, mayhem and murder. Our files are full of evidence on them."

Hubbard's efforts to cast the field of psychiatry as the source of all of humanity's problems are exemplified in a policy letter written in 1971, in which he attempted to redefine the word "psychiatrist" to mean "an antisocial enemy of the people":

Psychiatry and psychiatrist are easily redefined to mean 'an antisocial enemy of the people.' This takes the kill-crazy psychiatrist off the preferred list of professions. This is a good use of the technique  as for a century the psychiatrist has been setting an all-time record for inhumanity to Man.

Anti-psychiatric themes also appear in some of Hubbard's later fictional works. In Hubbard's ten-volume series Mission Earth, various characters debate the methods and validity of psychology. In his novel Battlefield Earth, the evil Catrists (a pun on psychiatrists), are described as a group of charlatans claiming to be mental health experts.

The Church of Scientology and psychiatry

A 1969 book, Believe What You Like, described an attempt by Scientologists to secretly infiltrate the National Association of Mental Health in Britain and turn official policy against mental health treatment. Though they were expelled from the organization after their identity and mission were revealed, the Church of Scientology then filed a number of suits against the NAMH.

When Operation Snow White, a Church of Scientology campaign to purge unfavorable records about Scientology and its founder L. Ron Hubbard, was revealed in 1980, it came to light that Scientology agents of the Guardian's Office had also conducted a similar campaign against the World Federation for Mental Health and the National Association of Mental Health.

Scientology's views are expressed by its president in the following quote:

What the Church opposes are brutal, inhumane psychiatric treatments. It does so for three principal reasons: 1) procedures such as electro-shock, drugs and lobotomy injure, maim and destroy people in the guise of help; 2) psychiatry is not a science and has no proven methods to justify the billions of dollars of government funds that are poured into it; and 3) psychiatric theories that man is a mere animal have been used to rationalize, for example, the wholesale slaughter of human beings in World Wars I and II.

An October 2006 article in the Evening Standard underlines the strong opposition of Scientology toward the psychiatric profession:

Up front, David Miscavige is dramatically — and somewhat bizarrely — attacking psychiatrists, his words backed by clips from a Scientology-produced DVD are broadcast on four giant high-definition TV screens and sensationally called: Psychiatry: an industry of death [...]. 'A woman is safer in a park at midnight than on a psychiatrist's couch', booms Miscavige, backed by savage graphics of psychiatrists — or 'psychs' as he calls them — being machine-gunned out of existence.

The group says that they are near victory in their war against psychiatry. In their treatise Those Who Oppose Scientology, it is stated:

Today, there are 500 Dianeticists and Scientologists to every psychiatrist […] while Scientology is more visible than ever, with churches dotting every continent on Earth and millions of parishioners around the world, one is hard pressed to find even a single psychiatrist with a shingle on his door.

Scientology claims a worldwide membership of more than 8 million, the total of people who have taken the Scientology introductory course. The Church of Scientology claims 3.5 million members in the United States, though an independent survey has found the number of people in the United States would state their religion as 'Scientology' is close to 55,000. By comparison, the American Psychiatric Association and the American Psychological Association, which are composed of psychiatrists and psychologists, have 38,000 and 148,000 members respectively.

Mental health care professionals are not concerned that the public will take Citizens Commission on Human Rights (CCHR) materials seriously, because of the organization's connection with the church; however, they argue that these materials can have a harmful impact when quoted without attribution.

Except for court trials and media publications and public rallies, published materials have received little notice outside of Scientology and CCHR; of reviews available, few are positive. Psychology professor Benjamin Beit-Hallahmi's short review of Psychiatrists: The Men Behind Hitler states:

Scientology has attracted much attention through its propaganda effort against what it calls psychiatry. This has involved great expense and organizational effort, carried out through a variety of fronts. If the book Psychiatrists: The Men Behind Hitler (Roder, Kubillus, & Burwell, 1995) is a representative example, and I believe it is, it proves decisively that the campaign is rooted in total paranoia and pathetic ignorance. Reading this book, and I will urge you not to waste too much time doing it, makes clear that the authors simply have no idea what psychiatry is.

The American Psychiatric Association's Lynn Schultz-Writsel adds:

We have not responded in any way, shape or form. There has not been a hue and cry from members to respond. And anyway, the publication speaks for itself.

Michael Burke, the president of the Kansas Psychiatric Association, said regarding Scientology, "They aren't really able to support their position with any scientific data, which they tend to ignore. … the public seems to be able to look right past the Scientology hoopla."

The commercial motivation of Scientology in questioning psychiatry, with their alternative practice, dianetics, has been questioned by Peter W. Huber.

According to Susan Raine in Scientology in Popular Culture (2017), The Church of Scientology's programs against psychiatry "complicates the movement's quest for religious legitimacy." This is because of "the way in which Hubbard tried to replace psychiatry, psychology and other forms of counseling and therapy with Scientology."

In a 2017 article in The Humanistic Psychologist, John H. Wolfe notes that Scientology has been widely discredited, and describes the ways in which Scientology differs from mainstream psychotherapy. He mentions that Scientology counseling is systematically thorough, meaning it considers a client’s issue individually and thoroughly before moving on to the next one. Wolfe also compares Scientology auditing to the “nondirective therapy” of Carl Rogers, “who stressed the importance of having the client find the client’s own answers, while the counselor refrains from interpretation, but listens with empathic understanding.” Unlike Roger’s technique however, Scientology’s auditors ask leading questions, instead of letting them independently stumble upon answers on their own.

Legal waivers
Following legal actions involving the Church of Scientology's relationship with its members, it has become standard practice within the group for members to sign lengthy legal contracts and waivers before engaging in Scientology services. In 2003, a series of media reports examined the legal contracts required by Scientology, which require that, among other things, Scientology followers deny any and all psychiatric care that their doctors may prescribe to them:

I do not believe in or subscribe to psychiatric labels for individuals. It is my strongly held religious belief that all mental problems are spiritual in nature and that there is no such thing as a mentally incompetent person — only those suffering from spiritual upset of one kind or another dramatized by an individual. I reject all psychiatric labels and intend for this Contract to clearly memorialize my desire to be helped exclusively through religious, spiritual means and not through any form of psychiatric treatment, specifically including involuntary commitment based on so-called lack of competence. Under no circumstances, at any time, do I wish to be denied my right to care from members of my religion to the exclusion of psychiatric care or psychiatric directed care, regardless of what any psychiatrist, medical person, designated member of the state or family member may assert supposedly on my behalf.

Citizens Commission on Human Rights

The Citizens Commission on Human Rights (CCHR), an institution set up by Scientology and Thomas Szasz, also claims that the real nature of psychiatry is that of human rights abuse.

In 1966 Hubbard declared all-out war on psychiatry, telling Scientologists that "We want at least one bad mark on every psychiatrist in England, a murder, an assault, or a rape or more than one." He committed the Church of Scientology to the goal of eradicating psychiatry in 1969, announcing that "Our war has been forced to become 'To take over absolutely the field of mental healing on this planet in all forms.'"

Not coincidentally, the Church of Scientology founded the Citizens Commission on Human Rights that same year as its primary vehicle for attacking psychiatry. CCHR still quotes Hubbard's above-cited statement that all psychiatrists are criminals: "There is not one institutional psychiatrist alive who, by ordinary criminal law, could not be arraigned and convicted of extortion, mayhem and murder. Our files are full of evidence on them."

CCHR has conducted campaigns against Prozac, against electroconvulsive therapy, against Ritalin (and the existence of ADHD) and against various health legislations. CCHR has also opened a permanent museum, "Psychiatry: An Industry of Death", in Hollywood.

Tom Cruise

Tom Cruise has been highly vocal in attacking the use of psychiatric medication, gaining particular attention for becoming extremely animated on the subject during an interview on Today on June 25, 2005. His position has attracted considerable criticism from psychiatrists and other physicians (American Psychiatric Association and National Mental Health Association), and individuals suffering from depression.

In January 2004, Cruise made the controversial statement "I think psychiatry should be outlawed." Further controversy erupted in 2005 after he openly criticized actress Brooke Shields for using the drug Paxil (paroxetine), an anti-depressant to which Shields attributes her recovery from postpartum depression after the birth of her first daughter in 2003. Cruise asserted that there is no such thing as a chemical imbalance and that psychiatry is a form of pseudoscience. Shields responded that Cruise "should stick to saving the world from aliens and let women who are experiencing postpartum depression decide what treatment options are best for them". This led to a heated argument between Matt Lauer and Cruise on NBC's Today on June 24, 2005.

Medical authorities view Cruise's comments as furthering the social stigma of mental illness. Shields herself called Cruise's comments "a disservice to mothers everywhere." In late August 2006, Cruise apologized in person to Shields for his comments.

Scientology is well known for its opposition to mainstream psychiatry and the psychoactive drugs which are routinely prescribed for treatment.  It was reported that Cruise's anti-psychiatry actions led to a rift with director Steven Spielberg. Spielberg had reportedly mentioned in Cruise's presence the name of a doctor friend who prescribed psychiatric medication. Shortly thereafter, the doctor's office was picketed by Scientologists, reportedly angering Spielberg.

Books by Scientologists
Bruce Wiseman from CCHR published the book Psychiatry: The Ultimate Betrayal (Scientology's Freedom Publications, 1995), in which he portrays psychiatry as creating Adolf Hitler.

The German Scientologists Thomas Roder and Volker Kubillus wrote the book Psychiatrists: the Men Behind Hitler (also published by Scientology's Freedom Publications, 1995–2001), that advances a conspiracy theory of all-powerful psychiatrists to overwhelm the world.

Death of Lisa McPherson

In 1994, Scientologist Lisa McPherson  moved from Dallas, Texas, to Clearwater, Florida, with her employer, AMC Publishing, which was at that time owned by Bennetta Slaughter and operated and staffed primarily by Scientologists. During June 1995, the church placed McPherson in an "introspection rundown" due to perceived mental instability. Lisa completed the rundown, and she attested to the state of Clear in September.

On November 18, 1995, McPherson was involved in a minor car accident. Paramedics initially left her alone because she was ambulatory, but after she began to remove her clothes, the paramedics decided to take her to the hospital. She remarked to the paramedics that she had taken off her clothes in hopes of obtaining counseling. Hospital staff agreed that she was unharmed, but recommended keeping her overnight for observation. Following intervention by fellow Scientologists, McPherson refused psychiatric observation or admission at the hospital and checked herself out after a short evaluation.

Pinellas-Pasco Circuit Judge Frank Quesada concluded:

McPherson was then taken to the Flag Land Base for "rest and relaxation" according to the Church of Scientology, but sworn statements demonstrate that McPherson was brought there for another introspection rundown.

Mark McGarry, an attorney with the Florida Office of the State Attorney, characterized McPherson's stay at the Flag Land Base as an "isolation watch":

The church accommodated McPherson in a cabana and kept a "24 hours' watch" over her. Detailed logs were kept on McPherson's day-to-day care. These logs were handwritten on plain white paper. Most of these logs were kept but the logs for the last three days were summarized from the originals and the originals shredded. Brian J. Anderson, the then Commanding Officer of the Church's Office of Special Affairs (OSA) in Clearwater, said in his sworn statement:

McPherson's "care logs" narrate the last seventeen days of her life: she was incoherent and sometimes violent, her nails were cut so she would not scratch herself or the staff, she bruised her fists and feet while hitting the wall. She had trouble sleeping and was being given natural supplements and the drug chloral hydrate to help her sleep. A Church staffer noted that McPherson "looked ill like measles or chicken pox on her face." On repeated occasions she refused food and protein shakes that the staff offered. On November 26 and 30 and December 3 to 4, the staff attempted to force feed her, noting that she spat the food out. She was noted to be very weak, not standing up nor on some days moving at all. Scientologists who questioned this handling were told to "butt out".

On December 5, 1995, the Church staffers contacted David Minkoff, a Scientologist medical doctor who twice prescribed McPherson Valium and chloral hydrate without examining her. They requested for him to prescribe an antibiotic to McPherson because she seemed to have an infection.  Minkoff refused and stated that McPherson should be taken to a hospital and he needed to see her before prescribing anything. They objected, expressing fear that McPherson would be put under psychiatric care. Dr. Janice Johnson, a senior medical officer at Flag Land Base who was assigned to care for McPherson, stated that McPherson had been gasping and had labored breathing while en route.  However they passed a total of four hospitals along the way to their ultimate destination. When they arrived at Minkoff's hospital 45 minutes north of Clearwater, McPherson exhibited no vital signs. Hospital staff attempted to resuscitate her for 20 minutes before declaring her dead.

Jeremy Perkins

On March 13, 2003, Scientologist Jeremy Perkins killed his mother, Elli, by stabbing her 77 times. Jeremy, previously diagnosed with schizophrenia, never received treatment after previous incidents with violence and hallucinations. His mother, active in the Buffalo Church of Scientology, felt that vitamins and Scientology routines were better than psychological counseling and anti-psychotic medication.

Linda Waliki

On July 5, 2007, a 25-year-old Australian woman, Linda Waliki, killed her 52-year-old father Michael, 15-year-old sister Kathryn, and injured her mother Sue with a knife. Her name was released in the print edition of the Sydney Morning Herald, on July 7, 2007. It was previously unreleased due to one of the victims being under age. She was diagnosed with a psychiatric illness, but her parents denied her continued psychiatric treatment due to their Scientology beliefs. Instead they replaced this medication with one specially imported from Scientologists in the United States.

Relations with anti-psychiatry movement

The Citizens Commission on Human Rights was co-founded by anti-psychiatrist Thomas Szasz and the Church of Scientology in 1969. Some anti-psychiatry websites and psychiatric survivors groups have sought to distance themselves from Scientology and the CCHR. In particular, the organisation Mind Freedom has specifically made public statements to emphasise that it is not connected with either CCHR or the Church of Scientology.

Despite sharing notable anti-psychiatry views on some issues with the secular critics, Scientology doctrine does differ in some respects. Scientology has promoted psychiatry-related conspiracy theories, including that psychiatrists were behind the Yugoslav Wars and that September 11 was caused by psychiatrists. Scientologists are religiously committed never to take psychiatric drugs and to reject psychology outright.

The socio-political roots of the movements have different origins. Advocates of the anti-psychiatric world view such as David Cooper, R. D. Laing and Michel Foucault had ties with the political left of the 1960s; Thomas Szasz, with the civil libertarians of the right, as well as an outspoken atheist. Many advocates of the anti-psychiatry movement have stated that they consider the idea of "mental illness" as a convenient and inaccurate label assigned by society rather than an objective biomedical state, rejecting psychiatric terms such as schizophrenia which they may see as stigmatizing. By contrast, Hubbard referred to "schizophrenics" in his writings on Scientology theory, and developed the emotional tone scale to, in part, gauge the health of a person's mental state. Furthermore, in his Science of Survival Hubbard suggested putting people very low on the scale into quarantine, a practice at odds with, for instance, the aim of the American Association for the Abolition of Involuntary Mental Hospitalization: an organization co-founded by Szasz to end involuntary commitment.

See also

 Alaska Mental Health Enabling Act 
 Anti-psychiatry
 Believe What You Like

References

External links
 Citizens Commission on Human Rights (affiliated with the Church of Scientology)
 Hubbard on psychiatry and psychology – Critical of the Church of Scientology's position about psychiatry
 Hubbard's plea to the Veteran's Administration for psychiatric help
 Scientology vs Psychiatry, a Case Study: The Atlantic

 
Anti-psychiatry